Pyrrhura (Greek 
Red/Fire Tail) is a genus of parrots in the Arini tribe. They occur in tropical and subtropical South America and southern Central America (Panama and Costa Rica). Most are restricted to humid forest and adjacent habitats, but one species, the blaze-winged parakeet, prefers deciduous or gallery woodland, and another, the Pfrimer's parakeet, is restricted to dry regions. Some species are highly endangered.

All have long, pointed tails, a mainly green plumage, and a relatively narrow, dark greyish to white eye-ring. Many have scaly or barred chest-patterns and a whitish, pale grey, buff or reddish ear-patch.

They typically move around in small, noisy flocks, flying swiftly at or below canopy level. Once settled in a tree they tend to be silent (especially if aware of danger) and difficult to spot. They nest in a tree-crevice.

Some species are popular in aviculture, where they are commonly referred to conures instead of parakeets.

The taxonomy of some groups, in particular the Pyrrhura picta and the P. leucotis complexes, has changed significantly in recent years. In late 2008 it was proposed that the members of the P. picta complex from north-eastern Peru (the so-called "group 6" in Joseph, 2002) should be considered a new species, the Amazon red-fronted parakeet, P. parvifrons. This has yet to receive widespread recognition (e.g., by SACC), and consequently it is not included in the below list.

Species
 Ochre-marked parakeet, Pyrrhura cruentata.
 Maroon-bellied parakeet, Pyrrhura frontalis.
 Blaze-winged parakeet, Pyrrhura devillei – traditionally a subspecies of P. frontalis.
 Crimson-bellied parakeet, Pyrrhura perlata – formerly P. rhodogaster.
 Pearly parakeet, Pyrrhura lepida – formerly P. perlata.
 Green-cheeked parakeet, Pyrrhura molinae.
 Painted parakeet, Pyrrhura picta.
 Sinú parakeet, Pyrrhura subandina – possibly extinct.
 Todd's (Perijá) parakeet, Pyrrhura picta caeruleiceps.
 Azuero parakeet, Pyrrhura picta eisenmanni.
 Venezuelan parakeet, Pyrrhura emma – Formally considered a subspecies of P. leucotis.
 Santarém (Hellmayr's) parakeet, Pyrrhura amazonum – traditionally a subspecies of P. picta.
 Madeira parakeet, Pyrrhura snethlageae
 Bonaparte's (Deville's) parakeet, Pyrrhura lucianii – traditionally a subspecies of P. picta.
 Rose-fronted parakeet, Pyrrhura roseifrons – traditionally a subspecies of P. picta.
 Wavy-breasted parakeet, Pyrrhura roseifrons peruviana.
 White-eared (maroon-faced) parakeet, Pyrrhura leucotis.
 Grey-breasted parakeet, Pyrrhura griseipectus.
 Pfrimer's parakeet, Pyrrhura pfrimeri – traditionally a subspecies of P. leucotis.
 Fiery-shouldered parakeet, Pyrrhura egregia.
 Santa Marta parakeet, Pyrrhura viridicata.
 Maroon-tailed parakeet, Pyrrhura melanura.
 El Oro parakeet, Pyrrhura orcesi.
 Black-capped (rock) parakeet, Pyrrhura rupicola.
 White-necked parakeet, Pyrrhura albipectus.
 Flame-winged (brown-breasted) parakeet, Pyrrhura calliptera.
 Red-eared parakeet, Pyrrhura hoematotis.
 Rose-headed (rose-crowned) parakeet, Pyrrhura rhodocephala.
 Sulphur-winged parakeet, Pyrrhura hoffmanni.

Species photographs

References

 Arndt, T. (2008). Anmerkungen zu einigen Pyrrhura-Formen mit der Beschreibung einer neuen Art und zweier neuer Unterarten. Papageien 8/2008.
 Joseph, L. (2002). Geographic variation, taxonomy and distribution of some Amazonian Pyrrhura parakeets. Ornitologia Neotropical 13 (4): 337–363.
 Juniper, T., and M. Parr (1998). A Guide to the Parrots of the World. Pica Press, East Sussex. 
 Remsen, J. V., Jr., C. D. Cadena, A. Jaramillo, M. Nores, J. F. Pacheco, M. B. Robbins, T. S. Schulenberg, F. G. Stiles, D. F. Stotz, and K. J. Zimmer. Version 28 Jun. 2007.  A classification of the bird species of South America. American Ornithologists' Union.
 Restall, R., C. Rodner, and M. Lentino. (2006). Birds of Northern South America - An Identification Guide.. Christopher Helm, London. 
 Ribas, C., L. Joseph, and C. Miyaki (2006). Molecular systematics and patterns of diversification in Pyrrhura (Psittacidae), with special reference to the picta-leucotis complex. Auk 123 (3): 660–680.

 
Bird genera
Taxa named by Charles Lucien Bonaparte